was a  after Tenchō and before Kashō. This period spanned the years from January 834  through July 848.

Change of era
 February 14, 834 : The new era name was created to mark an event or series of events. The previous era ended and the new one commenced in Tenchō 10, on the 3rd day of the 1st month of 834.

Events of the Jōwa era
 834 (Jōwa 1): Emperor Ninmyō planted a cherry tree near the shishinden to replace the tree Emperor Kanmu had planted at the time the capital was established in Kyoto.
 834 (Jōwa 1): Kūkai is given permission to establish a Shingon chapel at the Imperial Palace.
 June 11, 840 (Jōwa 7, 8th day of the 5th month): The former-Emperor Junna died at the age of 55.
 843 (Jōwa 10): Work was completed on the multi-volume Nihon Kōki.

By the Jōwa era, the formality of male promotions (Dansei jōi) were announced by the seventh day of each new year, while those for women (Onna jōi) were announced on the eighth day.

Notes

References
 Brown, Delmer M. and Ichirō Ishida, eds. (1979).  Gukanshō: The Future and the Past. Berkeley: University of California Press. ;  OCLC 251325323
 Ko, Dorothy, JaHyun Kim Haboush and Joan R. Piggott. (2003).  Women and Confucian Cultures in Premodern China, Korea, and Japan. . Berkeley: University of California Press. ; ;  OCLC 249343721
 Nussbaum, Louis-Frédéric and Käthe Roth. (2005).  Japan encyclopedia. Cambridge: Harvard University Press. ;  OCLC 58053128
 Titsingh, Isaac. (1834). Nihon Ōdai Ichiran; ou,  Annales des empereurs du Japon.  Paris: Royal Asiatic Society, Oriental Translation Fund of Great Britain and Ireland. OCLC 5850691
 Varley, H. Paul. (1980). A Chronicle of Gods and Sovereigns: Jinnō Shōtōki of Kitabatake Chikafusa. New York: Columbia University Press. ;  OCLC 6042764

External links 
 National Diet Library, "The Japanese Calendar" -- historical overview plus illustrative images from library's collection

Japanese eras
9th century in Japan
834 beginnings
848 endings